Rafael Dias do Nascimento or simply Rafael Dias (born February 12, 1983 in São Bernardo do Campo), is a Brazilian central defender. He currently plays for CRAC.

Honours
Goiás State League: 2006

Contract
14 February 2005 to 12 February 2010

External links
 sambafoot
 CBF
 goiasesporteclube.com

1983 births
Living people
People from São Bernardo do Campo
Brazilian footballers
Goiás Esporte Clube players
America Football Club (RJ) players
Association football defenders
Footballers from São Paulo (state)